is a passenger railway station located in the Asakura neighborhood  of the city of Kōchi, the capital of Kōchi Prefecture, Japan. It is operated by JR Shikoku and has the station number "K05".

Lines

In addition to the local trains of the Dosan Line, the following limited express services also stop at Asakura Station:

Layout
The station consists of two opposed side platforms serving two tracks. A log-style station building connected to platform 1 houses a waiting room and JR ticket window with Midori no Madoguchi facilities. 
Access to platform 2 is by a level crossing and ramps. A short siding juts partially into the other side of platform 1. Parking lots are located outside the station.

Adjacent stations

History
At this time the station was operated by Japanese Government Railways, later becoming Japanese National Railways (JNR). With the privatization of JNR on 1 April 1987, control of the station passed to JR Shikoku.

Connections

Surrounding area
Asakura campus of Kōchi University

See also
List of railway stations in Japan

References

External links

Asakura Station JR Shikoku 

Railway stations in Kōchi Prefecture
Railway stations in Japan opened in 1924
Kōchi